Bank Jacob Safra (Suisse) AG was a  full-service commercial banking institution headquartered in Geneva, Switzerland. As part of the Safra Group of financial institutions, in 2013 it merged with Bank Sarasin & Cie, when that bank was purchased by the Safra Group, with the combined entity being named J. Safra Sarasin.

Services 
Apart from Geneva, Bank Jacob Safra (Suisse) AG was present in Zurich, Lugano, Gibraltar, and Monaco. The majority of its operations consisted of financial services and private wealth management. In addition the bank also offered brokerage services, bond trading, lease financing, and correspondent banking.

History 
Named after Jacob Safra, the patriarch, the bank started its operations through the acquisition of Uto Bank AG (Zurich) in June 2000. It grew to 15 billion CHF of assets under management in less than 6 years.

In February 2006, Bank Jacob Safra expanded its operations in Monaco through the acquisition of the Monaco operations of Banca Gottardo the Banque du Gothard (Monaco) bringing it to 17.2 billion CHF in assets under management.

In 2013, Safra Group acquired Bank Sarasin & Cie, combining the two companies to become Bank J. Safra Sarasin.

See also 
Lebanese Jews
Safra Group
Joseph Safra
Edmond Safra
Moise Safra
J. Safra Sarasin

References

Banks of Switzerland
Safra family
Companies based in Geneva